Maria Laura da Silva Amorim (born 28 April 1932) is a Portuguese gymnast. She competed in six events at the 2022 Summer Olympics.

References

External links
 

1932 births
Living people
Portuguese female artistic gymnasts
Olympic gymnasts of Portugal
Gymnasts at the 1952 Summer Olympics
Place of birth missing (living people)
20th-century Portuguese women